Þórsvöllur is a football stadium in Iceland. It is located in Akureyri, and seats 984 individuals in one stand but the field can hold 2,000 standing spectators additionally. It is the home stadium for Icelandic football team Þór.

Football venues in Iceland
Vestmannaeyjar
Buildings and structures in Northeastern Region (Iceland)